The following is a list of notable political slogans.

Political slogan (listed alphabetically)

A
 Abki baar Modi Sarkar – Bharatiya Janata Party's campaign slogan for 2014 Indian Parliamentary Elections
 ACT UP, Fight Back, Fight AIDS – The slogan of the AIDS activist group ACT UP, the AIDS Coalition to Unleash Power, grassroots political activists working to end the HIV/AIDS pandemic

B
 Bangladesh Zindabad – Long live Bangladesh
 Believe women – used to encourage people to believe the testimony of women regarding violent and sexual assault.
 Bessarabia, Romanian land – Romanian nationalist and irredentist phrase posing claims over the region of Bessarabia.
 Better dead than Red – anti-Communist slogan.
 Black is beautiful – political slogan of a cultural movement that began in the 1960s by African Americans
 Black Lives Matter
 Black Power – a political slogan and a name for various associated ideologies, popularized by Stokely Carmichael in the 1960s.
 Blood and soil – political slogan for Nazi Germany's racial policies. Later adopted by other white-supremacist movements, including the alt-right in the United States.
 Brazil Above Everything, God Above Everyone – Brazilian President Jair Bolsonaro's most known slogan, emphasizing Brazilian people's Christianity and patriotism.
 Bread and roses – labor and immigrant rights slogan.
 Brotherhood and unity – used by the League of Communists of Yugoslavia after World War II.
 Build Back Better – name of the economic recovery plan put forward by the Joe Biden 2020 presidential campaign
 Build The Wall – political slogan used by Donald Trump, as a chant to build the border wall between Mexico and America.

C
 Choose Forward – election slogan of the Liberal Party of Canada for the 2019 Canadian federal election
 Chowkidar Chor Hai – coined by the Rahul Gandhi of Indian National Congress in 2019 election in response to Indian Prime Minister Narendra Modi calling himself Chowkidar.
 Church in Danger – used by the Tory Party in elections during Queen Anne's reign.
 Come and take it – Slogan at the Battle of Gonzales
 Compassionate conservatism – slogan of George W. Bush's campaign during the 2000 presidential election.
 Change is Coming
 campaign slogan used by Rodrigo Duterte in his presidential bid in the 2016 Philippine presidential elections
 slogan used by Mombasa County, Kenya, gubernatorial candidate Suleiman Shahbal during his bid to be the first Governor of the Cosmopolitan County.
 Common Prosperity a Chinese government political slogan and policy to bolster social equality.
 Change You Can Believe In—Barack Obama campaign slogan 2008

D
  Decolonise Education – slogan used to demand that universities in South Africa must dismantle of Eurocentric and Western centered ideas, institutions, interests, systems, symbols, and standards within the higher education system. It was used during the 2015 students protests which called for the removal of a statue at the University of Cape Town that commemorated Cecil Rhodes and the other 2015 students protests which followed calling for the abolition of fees in public universities in the country.
 Death to fascism, freedom to the people –  anti-Nazi slogan used by the Yugoslav resistance movement during World War II
 Deeds Not Words – Women's Social and Political Union suffragette slogan, 1903.
 ¡Democracia Real Ya! – (Real Democracy Now!) Used in the 2011 Spanish protests
 Deus, Patria, e Familia – Salazar reactionary slogan in the Estado Novo regime in Portugal
 Do you want John Quincy Adams who can write, or Andrew Jackson who can fight? – Jacksonian Democrat slogan in the 1820s
 Don't just hope for a better life. Vote for it. – slogan used by Margaret Thatcher.
 Don't let him take Britain back to the 1980s – 2010 Labour poster attacking Conservative leader, David Cameron.
 Don't Mess with Texas – slogan that began as anti-littering campaign; later adopted for political and other purposes
 There is no Stop, Keep Going On! – The general electoral slogan of the Justice and Development Party in the Turkish general elections of 2007. It is still used by the supporters.
 Dios en el cielo, Trujillo en la Tierra - (God on Heaven, Trujillo on Earth) slogan utilised by the regime of Rafael Leónidas Trujillo in the Dominican Republic.
 Drill, baby, drill – slogan used by the U.S. Republican Party to call for increasing domestic oil and gas production

E
 Each for all and all for each – Tariff Reform League, a protectionist British pressure group, in protest of what they considered to be  unfair foreign imports and to advocate Imperial Preference to protect British industry from foreign competition. 1905.
 Eat the Rich – A leftist slogan originally traced back to Jean-Jacques Rousseau, who is reputed to have said, "When the people shall have nothing more to eat, they will eat the rich."
 Ein Volk, ein Reich, ein Führer ("One people, one empire, one leader") – Nazi Germany.
 Empower your Future – Slogan used by the Workers' Party of Singapore in the 2015 general election
 Ena-Ena-Tessera (ένα-ένα-τέσσερα) – Greek slogan from the late 1960s to early 1970s, referencing  article 114 of the 1952 constitution.
 England Will Fight to the Last American – Slogan of the America First Committee, against providing aid to Britain during World War II
 Éirinn go Brách (Ireland Forever) – used to express allegiance to Ireland or Irish pride; anglicised "Erin go Bragh"
 Every Man a King – 1934 Introduced in February 1934, during a radio broadcast, this was the wealth and income redistributionist platform slogan (and later a song and a book) for Louisiana Governor Huey Long; it was part of a broader program that had the slogan, "Share Our Wealth".
 Extremism in the defense of liberty is no vice, moderation in the pursuit of justice is no virtue – Used by Barry Goldwater's campaign in the 1964 presidential election after his acceptance speech at the 1964 Republican National Convention.

F
 #FeesMustFall  – slogan used during the 2015 national student protests calling for the abolition of fees in public universities in South Africa.
 Fianna Fáil (Now... The Next Steps) – slogan used during 2007 Irish General Election
 Fifty-Four Forty or Fight – Oregon boundary dispute, 1846, Democrats claim all of Oregon Country for the United States
 For the many, not the few – Jeremy Corbyn's famous slogan for the Labour Party (UK) in the UK 2017
 Forward – Barack Obama, 2012 re-election campaign.
 Four new inventions – Chinese media, the year 2017
 From each according to his ability, to each according to his need (от каждого по способностям, каждому по потребностям)- Marxist slogan
 Fuck War! (Хуй войне!) – anti-Iraq War phrase made famous by Russian group t.A.T.u.
 Führer befiehl, wir folgen dir! (Führer command, we'll follow you!), from the song ""

G
 Ganyang Malaysia (Crush Malaysia) Indonesian anti-Malaysian slogan used by Sukarno in his speech against Malaysia during Konfrontasi in 1963.
 Get Brexit Done. Unleash Britain's Potential – Conservative Party slogan for the 2019 UK General Election
 Give me liberty, or give me death! – slogan coined by Patrick Henry prior to the American Revolutionary War, various versions and translations have been used around the world
 Glory to Ukraine! Glory to Heroes! (Слава Україні! Героям слава!) – slogan of Ukrainian nationalists originating from the Ukrainian War of Independence.
 God made Adam and Eve, not Adam and Steve – Anti-gay slogan used by Christians who oppose homosexuality on religious grounds, originating with the televangelist and Moral Majority leader Jerry Falwell.
 Got Guv? – A play on the "got milk" campaign; used by dairy owner Jim Oberweis in 2006 during his campaign for Governor of Illinois.
 Go For Growth – Australian Liberal 2007 campaign slogan used by John Howard. The slogan refers to the period of economic growth under his leadership.
 Go Imran Go – a slogan used by Pakistan Muslim League (N) supporters against the Imran Khan
 Go Nawaz Go – Inqilab March – Azaadi March slogan used by Pakistan Tehreek-e-Insaf and Pakistan Awami Tehrik supporters, during the political movement against the Nawaz Sharif government in Pakistan.

H
 Hakkō ichiu (All The World Under One Roof) – Japanese political slogan in the Second Sino-Japanese War to World War II.
 Had enough? – This was the 1946 slogan for Congressional elections for the out-of-power Republican Party; noting that they had been out of power in Congress since 1930, this slogan asked voters if they had "had enough" of the Democrats.
 Hands Off Russia – slogan created by British socialists protesting the Allied intervention in the Russian Civil War.
 ¡Hasta la victoria siempre! (Until Victory, Forever!) – Marxist revolutionary Che Guevara's famous slogan, and how he would end his letters.
 He killed my ma, he killed my pa, but I will vote for him – Charles Taylor's 1997 election slogan. Taylor threatened to restart the Liberian Civil War if he wasn't elected.
 Heim ins Reich (Back home into the Reich), describing the Adolf Hitler's initiative to include all areas with ethnic Germans into the German Reich (Austria, Sudetenland, Danzig, etc.) that led to World War II.
 He's Good Enough for Me – Balfour's Conservative poster, 1906 general election.
 "He is finished" (Gotov je), key symbol for the overthrow of Slobodan Milošević on October 5, 2000.
 Hey, Hey, LBJ, how many kids did you kill today? – Anti-Vietnam War and anti-Lyndon B. Johnson slogan from the 1960s. Other variations included, "How many boys did you kill today?"
 Hum Do Humare Do is an Indian Political Slogan given by Rahul Gandhi leader of Indian National Congress on 11 February 2021 in his Budget speech in Indian Parliament. Mr. Gandhi believes that Prime Minister Narendra Modi and Home Minister Amit Shah are unduly handing over India's wealth to their corporate friends, mainly two businessmen known as Adani and Ambani. This slogan was coined by Mr. Gandhi when India is witnessing the world's largest protests by Indian farmers against the corporatization of agriculture!

I
 I agree with Nick – Unofficial Liberal Democrat slogan for the 2010 United Kingdom general election, parodying Gordon Brown's performance in the televised debates where he often ended up espousing the same views as Lib Dem leader, Nick Clegg.
 I like Ike  – the slogan for the Draft Eisenhower movement, the only successful political draft of the 20th century.  It persuaded former General Dwight D. Eisenhower to run for President of the United States in 1952.
 I'm with Nicola – Used by the Scottish National Party (SNP) during the 2015 UK general election
 In your heart, you know he's right – Used by the Barry Goldwater presidential campaign
 In your guts you know he's nuts – Used by people who were against Barry Goldwater during his presidential campaign
 Inggris kita linggis, Amerika kita setrika (Britain we'll crowbar, United States we'll iron), Indonesian collaborationist slogan used by Sukarno during the Japanese occupation, which was also used later during the Konfrontasi and Indonesian withdrawal from the United Nations
 Inquilab Zindabad – A Hindustani phrase, which translates to "Long live the revolution". Used by communist parties in India and Pakistan.
 If you want a nigger for a neighbour, vote Liberal or Labour – Slogan for the successful candidacy of Peter Griffiths for Smethwick in the 1964 general election.
 It's Scotland's oil – Used by the Scottish National Party (SNP) during the 1970s in making their economic case for Scottish independence
 It's Time – Used by the Australian Labor Party in 1972; they had been out of government since 1949.
 It's Time for Real Change – Labour Party slogan for the 2019 UK General Election
 Il Duce ha sempre ragione! – Slogan used in Fascist Italian propaganda, translates to "The Duce [Benito Mussolini] is always right!"

J
 Jai Bhim – A Hindustani phrase translating to "Hail Bhim" or "Victory to Bhim" referring to B. R. Ambedkar. It is a slogan, greeting, or salute word used by Indians especially Ambedkarites.
 Jai Jawan Jai Kisan – Used by the Prime Minister of India Lal Bahadur Shashtri in 1965; It means hail the soldier and hail the farmer.
 Jai Jawan Jai Kisan Jay Vigyan – Used by the former Prime Minister of India Atal Bihari Vajpayee in 2001; It means hail the soldier, hail the farmer and hail the science.
 Jedem das Seine – Literally, the slogan means "to each his own" and was the German translation of Prussia's motto which read in Latin: "suum cuique". The meaning at that time was "justice for everyone". Used 1937–45 by Nazi Germany over the main gate at Buchenwald concentration camp it figuratively meant "everyone gets what he deserves". The slogan was already used in ancient Roman times by Cicero and Cato.
 Je suis Charlie – slogan born of the 2015 Charlie Hebdo killings, used by those expressing outrage or support for the victims, as well as the free speech movement
 Joy Bangla – Slogan used by the people in the Bangladesh Liberation War in 1971.

K
 Keep the Bastards Honest – slogan used by the Australian Democrats since the 1980 Australian federal election.
 Khela Hobe – slogan used in Bangladesh and India.
 "Kosovo is Serbia" (Kosovo je Srbija), slogan used by protesters as a reaction to Kosovo's unilateral declaration of independence.

L
 Labour Isn't Working – 1978 Conservative Party poster devised by Saatchi and Saatchi. The poster showed a long queue outside an 'unemployment office' commenting on the high levels of unemployment. The campaign was a success with the Conservatives winning the election and Margaret Thatcher becoming Prime Minister.
 La vida por Perón - (Our life for Perón) peronist slogan, mostly utilised by protesters and guerrilla organisations during the Argentine Revolution (1966-1973), when Juan Domingo Perón was exiled and barred from entering the country. The phrase was immortalised by peronist and "K" groups.
 Lal Salam –  A Hindustani phrase translating to "Red Salute". It is a salute, greeting, or code word used by communists in Indian subcontinent.
 Last Best West – slogan of Canada encouraging immigration to the Prairie Provinces.
 LBJ for the USA – used by the Lyndon Baines Johnson presidential campaign
 Let's Go Brandon - a slogan used by the Republican party who support Donald Trump towards Joe Biden.
 Let's Keep Moving – New Zealand Labour Party
 Le Québec aux Québécois – (Quebec for the Québécois)  Separatist chant. 1970s+
 Liberté, Égalité, Fraternité (Liberty, Equality, Fraternity) – the national motto of France, with its origins in the French Revolution.
 Lips That Touch Liquor Must Never Touch Mine – slogan of the Anti-Saloon League of the U.S. temperance movement from a poem from George W. Young, supposedly written c. 1870
 Liberation before education – slogan in opposition to the segregated Bantu education system in South Africa under apartheid.
 Lock Her Up - a phrase used by the Republican party who support Donald Trump towards Hillary Clinton.

M
 Mujhy keu nikala – why you ousted me out, famous slogan of Nawaz Sharif when he was ousted out of office of prime minister 3rd time.
 Ma Mati Manush – popular political slogan coined by Mamata Banerjee, Chief Minister of West Bengal, who represented All India Trinamool Congress
 Maggie, Maggie, Maggie – Out, Out, Out – Popular chant used at rallies and marched opposing the government of Margaret Thatcher.
 Make America Great Again – Slogan used by various conservative political candidates in the United States since 1980, most notably Ronald Reagan and Donald Trump.
 MATH – Make America Think Harder – Slogan used by Andrew Yang.
 Make love, not war – anti-war slogan began during the War in Vietnam
 Me ne frego! – Slogan used by the Benito Mussolini's blackshirts, literally "I don't give a damn".
 Meine Ehre heißt Treue – motto of the Schutzstaffel in Nazi Germany, meaning "My honor is called loyalty." Banned in modern Germany along with other Nazi slogans under Strafgesetzbuch section 86a.
 Merkel muss weg! ("Merkel must go!") – Slogan commonly used by the Islamophobic right-wing PEGIDA movement in (mostly former East) Germany.
 More to do but we're heading in the right direction – Slogan of the NSW Labor government of 2007. They were returned to office, but defeated in a landslide in 2011.
 Moving New Hampshire Forward – Slogan used by Maggie Hassan in her 2012 NH gubernatorial campaign.

N
 Naya Pakistan – Slogan used by Pakistan Tehreek-e-Insaf in its 2013 election campaign.
 Never had it so good – 1957 campaign under Harold Macmillan's leadership of the Conservative Party.
 Never been had so good – 1957 campaign slogan of the British Labour Party (in response to the Tory slogan).
 Never Forget – Commemorative slogan used in the United States in reference to the September 11, 2001, terrorist attacks
 New Labour, New Danger – Slogan on 1997 Conservative Party campaign poster showing Tony Blair with glowing red eyes. The campaign backfired as the poster was criticized for implying that Blair, a stated Christian, was demonic and then the Conservative Party's failure to state who had authorized the poster.
 New Nationalism – campaign slogan of Theodore Roosevelt's 1912 presidential campaign and the Progressive Party. Derived from Herbert Croly's pamphlet The Promise of American Life and adopted by Roosevelt after an August 1910 speech in Osawatomie, Kansas.
 The New Freedom – campaign slogan of Woodrow Wilson's 1912 presidential campaign
 Ni dieu, Ni maitre (No God, No Master) – A French anti-religious saying.
 ¡No pasarán! ¡Pasaremos! (They shall not pass! But we will!) – Slogan of International Brigade in Spanish Civil War in reference to the Nationalist siege of Madrid.
 Touch one, touch all – Australian unionist slogan meaning harming one worker, harms all workers.
 No Surrender! – Pro Northern Irish Loyalist slogan referring to the Siege of Derry
 No return to the status quo – used by former Sinn Féin Deputy First Minister (DFM) of Northern Ireland Martin McGuiness when he resigned as DFM during the Renewable Heat Incentive scandal. His resignation triggered the 2017 Northern Ireland Assembly election and the party has used this as their slogan since.
 No taxation without representation – slogan first used during the American Revolutionary War
 Nothing About Us Without Us! is a slogan used to communicate the idea that no policy should be decided by any representative without the full and direct participation of members of the group(s) affected by that policy.
 Not Me. Us. – Slogan used by American Democratic Party Presidential Nomination contender Bernie Sanders in the 2016 Democratic Party presidential primaries and the 2020 Democratic Party presidential primaries.
 No War but Class War – Used by diverse Marxist groups as a means of underlining the priority of class struggle above other political aims – and as a general anti-militarist slogan.

O
 On Your Side – Slogan of the Australian Labor Party for its 2022 Australian federal election campaign.
 One man, one vote – slogan used worldwide for universal suffrage, most famously in the United Kingdom, the United States, and South Africa.
 One settler, one bullet. – rallying cry of the Azanian People's Liberation Army during the armed struggle against apartheid.
 One people under one God saluting one flag – slogan used during and after 2016 U.S. presidential campaign, particularly by the Christian right.
 Not a step back! (Ни шагу назад!) – The motto representing Joseph Stalin's Order No. 227 issued on July 28, 1942. It is famous for its line "Not a step back!", that became a slogan of Soviet antifascist resistance.

P
 Pakistan khappay (God bless Pakistan)
 Patriotism, protection, and prosperity – slogan of the Republican Party and William McKinley's campaign in the 1896 presidential election in support of the gold standard and protectionism.
 Patriarchy Must Fall – slogan used during the 2015 national student protests calling for the abolition of fees in public universities in South Africa and against gender based violence in South African universities.
 Patria o Muerte (Homeland or Death) – A 1960 slogan of Fidel Castro used for the first time at a memorial service for the La Coubre explosion. As a result, it became a motto of the Cuban Revolution.
 Patria y Vida (Homeland and Life) – A slogan and song associated with the 2021 Cuban protests. It is an inversion of the Cuban Revolution motto Patria o Muerte (Homeland or Death). The slogan was popularized by a reggaeton song released in February 2021 by Yotuel, Descemer Bueno, Gente de Zona, Luis Manuel Otero Alcántara, Maykel Osorbo and DJ El Funky. It originates with the San Isidro Movement.
 Perón o muerte – (Perón or death) Peronist slogan used in Argentina.
 Peace with Honor – phrase originally used by Cicero and William Shakespeare. Originated as a political slogan by Edmund Burke in favor of a conciliatory policy towards the Thirteen Colonies during the American Revolution. British Prime Minister Benjamin Disraeli and the Conservative Party revived the slogan after the Congress of Berlin. It was famously repeated by Prime Minister Neville Chamberlain after concluding the Munich Agreement with Nazi Germany before World War II, which was criticized by Chamberlain's opponents including Winston Churchill. President Richard Nixon evoked the concept in reference to the Paris Peace Accords ending U.S. involvement in the Vietnam War.
 Peace without surrender – slogan of anti-communists in the Republican Party during the Cold War in the 1950s and the 1960s, most famously Richard Nixon's campaign in the 1960 presidential election.
 Piss On Pity is a rallying cry for those in the disability-inclusive circles of world politics.
 Power to the people – A frequent anti-establishment slogan used in a variety of contexts by different political groups around the world such as libertarians, socialists and pro-democracy movements.
 Proletariat of the world, unite! (Пролетарии всех стран, соединяйтесь!) – A Soviet communist slogan coined by Karl Marx from The Communist Manifesto.
 Promises Kept – Slogan used by Thomas P. Gordon in 2012 race for New Castle County Executive.
 Putin Must Go – Slogan of opponents of Russian President Vladimir Putin since 2010.

R
 Rooti, kapra aur makan – Pakistan peoples party slogan.
 Rally Around O'Malley – Campaign slogan used during Patrick O'Malley's 2002 Illinois gubernatorial campaign.
 Read my lips: no new taxes – Used by George H. W. Bush.
 Return integrity to the White House – Used by the Democratic nominee Jimmy Carter's 1976 presidential campaign in conduct to the Republican Party and President Richard Nixon in the Watergate scandal. 
 Remember Pearl Harbor! – A slogan, a song, an invitation to encourage American patriotism and sacrifice during World War II.
 Remember the Alamo! – Battle cry at the Battle of San Jacinto.
 Remember the Maine! – The rallying cry during the Spanish–American War.
 Revolution is not a dinner party – A phrase by Mao Zedong, extracted from his full statement that "Revolution is not a dinner party, nor an essay, nor a painting, nor a piece of embroidery; it cannot be advanced softly, gradually, carefully, considerately, respectfully, politely, plainly, and modestly. A revolution is an insurrection, an act of violence by which one class overthrows another."
 Ro Imran Ro – A slogan used by Pakistan Muslim League (N) supporters during Pakistan Tehreek-e-Insaf sit-in in Islamabad.
 Remember Remember the Fifth of November – a phrase from popular English poem that refers to Guy Fawkes Night.
 Rhodes Must Fall  – slogan used during the early 2015 students protests in South Africa. It was directed against the now removed statue at the University of Cape Town (UCT) that commemorated Cecil Rhodes. The campaign led to a wider movement to decolonise education across South Africa.

S
 Safe and Strong – WA Labor's campaign slogan during the 2021 Western Australian state election.
 Safety First – Conservative election poster during the 1929 United Kingdom general election.
 Save the Bay – Chesapeake Bay Foundation slogan to save the Chesapeake Bay. Also the name, and main slogan, for Save The Bay, a San Francisco Bay environmental organization
 Să trăiți bine! ("May you live well!") – one of the slogans used by president Traian Băsescu in the 2004 presidential campaign. After he had been elected, Romanians' standard of living did not perceivably improve, and his former slogan became probably the most famous example of empty political campaign promises, used both by Mr. Băsescu's political opponents and by disgruntled citizens as a cynical way of expressing critique and discontent towards his presidency. In 2014, Băsescu mentioned that this electoral slogan was meant as wishing well to the Romanians, not as a promise, and that he was misunderstood, although this very tagline was used in a 2004 electoral poster along various political promises.
 Send Her Back - a slogan used by the Republican party who support Donald Trump towards Ilhan Omar.
 Serve the People (全心全意为人民服务) – a political slogan of Mao Zedong. The slogan later became popular among the New Left, Red Guard Party, and Black Panther Party; due to their strong Maoist influences.
 Simon Go Back – Against the Simon Commission: The Indian Statutory Commission was a group of seven British Members of Parliament that had been dispatched to India in 1927 to study constitutional reform in that colony. It was commonly referred to as the Simon Commission after its chairman, Sir John Simon. Ironically, one of its members was Clement Attlee, who subsequently became the British Prime Minister who would oversee the granting of independence to India and Pakistan in 1947.
 Sí se puede. Spanish for “Yes, we can.” The United Farm Workers motto.
 Siganme, no los voy a defraudar! - (Follow me, I will not disappoint you!) Slogan used by peronist president of Argentina Carlos Saul Menem early into his first term.
 Sinn Féin – Irish Gaelic motto for the Irish Home Rule movement beginning in the 19th century, translates to "We ourselves." Inspired political party of the same name in Northern Ireland.
 Sous les pavés, la plage! ("Under the cobblestones, the beach!") Notable slogan of the May '68 demonstrations in France.
 Stanley Baldwin the Man You Can Trust! – 1929 election poster
 Stay the course – Popularized by Ronald Reagan while campaigning for Republicans during the 1982 mid-term elections and later picked up by his Vice President George H.W. Bush.
 Slavery is a social, moral, and political wrong – Used by Abraham Lincoln and the Republican Party during the 1860 presidential election.
 Stop Brexit. Build a Brighter Future – Liberal Democrats' slogan for the 2019 UK General Election
 Stop the boats – Tony Abbott, during his time as Leader of the Liberal Party
 Strong and stable – Theresa May
 Suit-Boot Ki Sarkar (approximately translated as "a government of capitalists", ie "those dressed in suits and boots") – an Indian political slogan introduced by Rahul Gandhi on 23 April 2015. He had accused Indian Prime Minister Narendra Modi of favoring his rich corporate friends. Secure the Future Erin O'Tooles 2021 election slogan in Canada

T
 Tabdeeli aa nahi rahi – Tabdeeli aa gai hai – Slogan used by Pakistan Tehreek-e-Insaf during their 2013 election campaign; later made a part of the party's anthem
 The Buck Stops Here – A phrase first uttered by US president Harry S. Truman in reference to government accountability
 The Chinese must go – used by 19th century California labor leader Denis Kearney, known for his anti-Chinese stance, who ended every speech with the phrase
 The personal is political – Associated with second wave feminism in the 1960s.
 The Party Of Lincoln Is Dead – A phrase first used by segregationists after the assassination of Abraham Lincoln.
 The rich get richer and the poor get poorer – Used by Marxist-inspired socialists to criticize capitalism
 The stakes are too high for you to stay home – Used by Lyndon B. Johnson's 1964 presidential campaign in the Daisy advertisement. Aired during the Cold War, and meant to imply that Johnson's opponent Barry Goldwater would cause a nuclear war with the Soviet Union if elected.
 There Ain't No Such Thing as a Free Lunch – the first official slogan of the Libertarian Party, a phrase popularized by Robert A. Heinlein in his 1966 novel The Moon Is a Harsh Mistress. Commonly abbreviated as 'TANSTAFL'.
 The whole world is watching – phrase used by anti-war demonstrators and others
 There is no alternative – a slogan often used by Margaret Thatcher.
 They shall not pass (Spanish: ¡No Pasaran!) – used during the Battle of Verdun in World War I by French General Robert Nivelle
 Three Word Chant! – Anarchist anti-slogan used in the 1999 Seattle WTO protests to illustrate the reification of the slogan in mass culture.
 Think globally, act locally or "Think global, act local" has been used in various contexts, including town planning, environment, and business
 Tiocfaidh ár lá (Our Day Will Come) – slogan for a United Ireland
 Tippecanoe and Tyler Too – campaign slogan from the 1840 United States presidential election
 Tutto nello Stato, niente al di fuori dello Stato, nulla contro lo Stato (Everything in the State, nothing outside the State, nothing against the State) – Early 1930s Italian Fascist slogan.
 Trust Baldwin he will steer you to safety! – 1929 Conservative poster
 Tyler and Texas! – John Tyler's slogan for supporting the annexation of Texas.

U
 ¡Una, Grande y Libre! – "One, Great and Free!", a Francoist slogan from Spain. It expressed three nationalist concepts; One) indivisible, against regional separatism, Great) in recognition of its imperial past and advocation of future expansion in Africa, Free) not submitted to internationalist foreign influences, which was a reference to what Francoists claimed was a "Judeo-Masonic-International Communist conspiracy" against Spain.
 Up the proletariat! – loosely attributed to Karl Marx and early Marxist movements.
 United we stand America – Slogan of Ross Perot in his campaign in the 1992 presidential election. Later adopted for the Reform Party.

V
 Venceremos (We will overcome/we shall triumph) – A Spanish phrase associated with the Cuban Revolution and socialism in Latin America and unofficial national anthem of Chile during the period leading up to the coup.
 Vivre Libre ou Mourir ("Live free or die") – French Revolution slogan
 Vote for Change – British Conservative party slogan for the 2010 general election.

W
 War on Women – Political slogan used by the Democratic Party in the United States in attacks from 2010 onward.
 We are the 99% – a solidarity internet meme commonly associated with the 2011 Occupy Wall Street and associated protests
 When the looting starts, the shooting starts – Statement by Walter Headley on the eve of the 1968 Republican National Convention in response to unrest, Re-introduced into the political narrative by Donald Trump in response to protests relating to the murder of George Floyd.
 White male privilege – catch phrase authored by Peggy McIntosh and used in Women's Studies, labor union and political party identity politics campaigns to attract non- white males and validate sentiments about white men's privilege. Variants include: "unearned white male privilege" and "privileged old white men".
 White Power – slogan and chant of white supremacists
 Wir schaffen das  ("We will make it!"; "we can manage this"; "we can do it"; "we can do this") 2015 slogan used by Chancellor Angela Merkel to defend her open border policy during the 2015 European migrant crisis
 Wir sind das Volk (We are the people), motto of the "Monday demonstrations" that led to the demise of the German Democratic Republic and German reunification.
 With you, For you, For Singapore – People's Action Party slogan in the 2015 general election, Singapore.
 Workers of the world, unite! – one of the most famous rallying cries of the socialist, communist and labor movements.
 What this country needs is a good five-cent cigar – First said by Vice President Thomas R. Marshall in the U.S. Senate
 Whip inflation now (WIN) – Initiative by the administration of President Gerald Ford to combat stagflation during the recession of the 1970s by voluntary measures as opposed to the minimum wage and price controls pursued by his predecessor Richard Nixon, liberal Republicans, and the Democratic Party. Widely ridiculed by the public and contributed to the Democratic Party's victory in the 1974 congressional elections and the 1976 presidential election. Abandoned during the 1976 Republican Party presidential primaries in favor of a program of tax cuts.

Y
 Yes We Can – Barack Obama, 2008 US presidential campaign. Inspired by the Spanish slogan "Si se puede." of the United Farm Workers.
 Ya me ye  (It's ours) – Peoples Democratic Party slogan of the electoral campaign for the  2019 Turkish municipal elections.
 You shall not press down upon the brow of labor this crown of thorns, you shall not crucify mankind upon a cross of gold. – Slogan of William Jennings Bryan's campaign during the 1896 presidential election in opposition to the gold standard.

Z
 Zimbabwean Lives Matter a 2020 online protest against the government of Zimbabwean President Emmerson Mnangagwa

See also
 Slogans
 List of labor slogans
 List of U.K. political slogans
 List of U.S. presidential campaign slogans
 List of United States political catchphrases

References

 
Lists of slogans
Political slogans